List of Missouri Tigers football annual records since inception in 1890.

Year-by-year record

11960 team lost to Kansas but was later awarded win by default due to an ineligible Kansas player, (Bert Coan).

References

Missouri
Missouri Tigers football seasons